Greg Kuperberg (born July 4, 1967) is a Polish-born American mathematician known for his contributions to geometric topology, quantum algebra, and combinatorics. Kuperberg is a professor of mathematics at the University of California, Davis.

Biography

Kuperberg is the son of two mathematicians, Krystyna Kuperberg and Włodzimierz Kuperberg.  He was born in Poland in 1967, but his family emigrated to Sweden in 1969 due to the 1968 Polish political crisis.  In 1972, Kuperberg's family moved to the United States, eventually settling in Auburn, Alabama.

Kuperberg wrote three computer games for the IBM Personal Computer in 1982 and 1983 (which were published by Orion Software): Paratrooper, PC-Man and J-Bird. (video game clones of Sabotage, Pac-Man and Q*bert, respectively)

He enrolled at Harvard University in 1983 and received a bachelor's degree in 1987. He was ranked Top 10 in the 1986 William Lowell Putnam Mathematical Competition. Upon leaving Harvard, Kuperberg studied at the University of California, Berkeley under Andrew Casson, receiving a Ph.D. in geometric topology and quantum algebra in 1991.  From 1991 until 1992, Kuperberg was a NSF postdoctoral fellow and adjunct assistant professor at Berkeley, and from 1992 to 1995 held a Dickson Instructorship at the University of Chicago.  From 1995 through 1996, Kuperberg was Gibbs Assistant Professor at Yale University after which he joined the mathematics faculty at the University of California, Davis. In 2012 he became a fellow of the American Mathematical Society.

Kuperberg is married to physicist Rena Zieve, who is a professor of physics at UC Davis.

Selected publications

Kuperberg has over fifty publications, including two in the Annals of Mathematics.

 
 
 with Krystyna Kuperberg:

References

External links
 Greg Kuperberg, faculty page at UC-Davis
 
 Bits from my personal collection - the original IBM PC and Orion Software

1967 births
Polish mathematicians
20th-century American mathematicians
21st-century American mathematicians
Auburn High School (Alabama) alumni
Harvard University alumni
Living people
People from Auburn, Alabama
Polish emigrants to the United States
Topologists
University of California, Berkeley alumni
University of California, Davis faculty
Fellows of the American Mathematical Society
American video game programmers